Bartkuškis Manor is a former residential manor in Bartkuškis village, Širvintos District Municipality.

References

Manor houses in Lithuania
Classicism architecture in Lithuania